Portnov (feminine: Portnova) is a Russian-language occupational surname derived from the occupation of portnoy, "tailor" and literally meaning "<child> of the tailor".

The surname may refer to:
Aleksandr Portnov, Soviet Olympic diver
Andrii Portnov, Ukrainian historian
Andriy Portnov, Ukrainian lawyer
Zinaida Portnova, hero of the Soviet Union
Larion Portnov, a mayor of Odessa, Ukraine

Occupational surnames
Russian-language surnames